Fabiana López (born 20 January 1966) is a Mexican fencer. She competed in the women's individual foil event at the 1988 Summer Olympics.

References

External links
 

1966 births
Living people
Mexican female foil fencers
Olympic fencers of Mexico
Fencers at the 1988 Summer Olympics
Pan American Games medalists in fencing
Pan American Games bronze medalists for Mexico
Fencers at the 1987 Pan American Games
20th-century Mexican women
21st-century Mexican women